Lists of British people cover people from the United Kingdom of Great Britain and Northern Ireland. The list are organized by region, by religion, by country of origin and by occupation.

By region

 List of English people
 List of Welsh people
 List of Scots
 List of people from Northern Ireland

Crown Dependencies
 List of Manx people
 List of people from Guernsey
 List of people from Jersey

By religion

 List of British Muslims
 List of British Jews

By country of origin

 Lists of British people by ethnic or national origin

Europe
 French
 Dutch
 German
 Greek
 Irish
 Italian
 Nordic
 Portuguese
 Spanish
West Asia
 Azerbaijani
 Iranian
 Iraqi
 Jewish
 Turkish
South Asia
 Bangladeshi
 Indian
 Pakistani
 Sri Lankan
Africa
 Ghanaian
 Nigerian
 Somali
 Zimbabwean
Caribbean
 Barbadian
 Guyanese 
 Jamaican
 Trinidadian
East Asia
 East Asian
 Chinese
 Japanese
Latin America
 Latin American
 Brazilian
 Mexican

By occupation
 List of British actors
 List of British architects
 List of British artists
 List of British DJs
 List of British painters
 List of British philosophers
 List of British investors

See also
Lists of people by nationality